Never Look Back is a 1952 British drama film directed by Francis Searle and starring Rosamund John, Hugh Sinclair and Guy Middleton. The screenplay concerns a newly appointed female barrister whose career is threatened by a former lover. It was made by Hammer Films at the Mancunian Studios in Manchester.

Plot
Anne Maitland is the King's Counsel who receives an unexpected late-night visit from ex-boyfriend Guy Ransome (Middleton). When Ransome is then accused of murdering his mistress on the same night, Anne takes on his defense. In a court battle against Nigel Stewart, a barrister who is madly in love with her, Maitland clears Ransome of murder by disclosing her earlier relationship with him, and that he was staying in her flat on the night of the crime. However, when it is discovered that Ransome did commit the murder, Maitland's reputation is in tatters. But this failure leaves her finally able to marry Nigel Stewart when he is no longer a professional threat.

Cast
 Rosamund John as Anne Maitland, K.C. 
 Hugh Sinclair as Nigel Stewart 
 Guy Middleton as Guy Ransome 
 Henry Edwards as Geoffrey Whitcomb 
 Terence Longdon as Alan Whitcomb 
 John Warwick as Inspector Raynor 
 Brenda de Banzie as Molly Wheeler 
 Arthur Howard as Charles Vaughan 
 Bruce Belfrage as The Judge 
 Fanny Rowe as Liz  
 H.S. Hills as Frank Lindsell 
 Hélène Burls as Mrs. Brock 
 Bill Shine as Willie
 Timothy Bateson as Court Official
 Harry H. Corbett as Policeman in Charge Cells
 June Mitchell as Secretary 
 Barbara Shaw as Press Woman 
 David Scase as Cameraman 
 Norman Somers as Nigel Junior

Critical reception
TV Guide gave the film two out of four stars, and wrote, "the British legal system is invested with enough romantic drama to rival a soap opera in this intriguing thriller."

References

Bibliography
 Chibnall, Steve & McFarlane, Brian. The British 'B' Film. Palgrave MacMillan, 2009.

External links

1952 films
1952 drama films
1950s legal films
British drama films
British legal films
Films directed by Francis Searle
British courtroom films
Hammer Film Productions films
Films set in London
British black-and-white films
Films shot in Greater Manchester
1950s English-language films
1950s British films